Nagbhid, also known as Nagbhir, is a town and a municipal council in Chandrapur district in the Indian state of Maharashtra.
It Connected to NH-353D and MSH-9.

Railway
Nagbhid town is served by Nagbhir Junction railway station. Nagpur-Nagbhir is a narrow gauge route of 110 km which connects to Gondia- Balharshah  route at Nagbhir Junction railway station. Gondia- Balharshah line was converted to broad gauge in 1999. Conversion to broad gauge of Nagpur-Nagbhir line has been approved and is expected to commence soon.

References 

Cities and towns in Chandrapur district
Talukas in Maharashtra